The Battle of Mount Puray, sometimes known as Battle of Mount Purog, was fought on June 14, 1897, between the Philippine revolutionaries led by Revolutionary President Emilio Aguinaldo and General Licerio Geronimo and Spanish forces sent under orders by Governor-General Fernando Primo de Rivera. Filipino forces won a victory in this battle in which a Spanish army pursuing them was crushed and routed. The Filipinos' victory in the battle ended the long evacuation from Cavite to Morong, and made possible the setting up of their new revolutionary headquarters in the battlefield's vicinity and then later to Biac-na-Bato in Bulacan.

Prelude 

Filipino revolutionaries who joined Aguinaldo and his staff evacuated Cavite after the fall of most of its territory to the Spanish. The retreat commenced from a remote village in Dasmariñas, and it took via Laguna until they reached the hills of Mount Puray which was in the hilly eastern part of the town of Montalban. From there they were met by a Morong-based army led by Licerio Geronimo, and thence set up temporary camp until word reached that a huge Spanish column led by Colonel Felipe Dujiols was on its way to meet them.

Battle 
With the oncoming Spanish attack, Aguinaldo then commanded his to dig temporary trenches facing downwards from Mount Puray. Filipino units led by sub-commander Licerio Geronimo were positioned at their appropriate areas of defense. The thick forest of the hills also helped the Filipino defenders from the firepower of Spanish machine guns and artillery present. The Spanish column which is several times larger that of the Filipino force present had now arrived at the foot of the hill and encamped themselves there. Once in position, they were then ordered by Dujiols to promptly attack the hill which they did, although he was under express orders by Primo de Rivera not to engage until he and his reinforcements arrive in the field. For six hours the Spanish though more numerous predictably suffered heavy losses under Filipino enfilade fire coming from the dugouts and thickets, and they retreated back towards their camp. Hours later, when Aguinaldo finally felt the initiative passed to his, he ordered some Filipinos to steal and wear the uniforms of the dead Spaniards and had them pretend to be among them, before sending them to infiltrate the Spanish camp where they caused confusion and then promptly ambushed the camp, suffering even more losses on dead and wounded upon the Spanish who then retreated from the field back as far away as into the town center of San Mateo in disorder.

Aftermath
The Filipinos won their first battle in months, and the battle at Mount Puray proved to be a much-needed morale raiser for them and the revolutionary endeavor. News of Aguinaldo's victory in battle spread to other provinces, as a result by early August the province of Cavite, despite being reverted to Spanish control some months earlier, is once again in open revolt, seriously jeopardizing efforts to pacify the province.

Aguinaldo then set up his temporary headquarters in Mount Puray, and from there revolutionary commanders from across different provinces, including Mariano Llanera of Nueva Ecija and Francisco Macabulos of Tarlac, convened there for a time. The area was deemed too close to the front, however, and the revolutionary headquarters eventually had to be moved out to Norzagaray and then Angat until it was finalized at Biak-na-Bato in Bulacan by June 24 some distance north. Geronimo's force of Morong rebels had to stay behind Mount Puray to check any effort of Spanish pursuit while the revolutionary government relocates to a more secure location up north. From thence, it became the new capital of the Filipino revolutionary government, from which he, as the revolutionary president, would issue orders to be spread across the whole Philippine archipelago for the locals to rise up against the Spanish yoke, thereby extending the revolution from just eight of the original provinces who first rose up in revolt to include all of the Philippines.

See also
Republic of Biak-na-Bato
Battle of Aliaga

References

Mount Puray
History of Rizal
Mount Puray